The rear wheel drive D platform was a body on frame chassis used only by Imperial from 1957 until 1966, (although Chrysler would not use such nomenclature until 1964). The D Platform had no major chassis components in common with any other Chrysler product and consequently maintained noticeably wider shoulder room and different exterior styling from contemporaneous Chrysler C platforms.

Famed for their durability and crashworthiness, Imperials built on the D platform were once a favorite of demolition derby contestants, so much so that demolition derbies have since outlawed the cars from most competitions.

See also
 Chrysler platforms

References

External links
Imperial: Y body or C body or D body? (AllPar)

D platform